Certain cases heard by the Supreme Court of Canada can be decided without significant deliberation or justification. In such situations the court will give their reasons for judgment orally after the parties have finished making their submission.
 
The following is a list of the published reasons of the Supreme Court of Canada that were given orally.

2003

2004

2005

Supreme Court of Canada